Lichfield is a local government district in Staffordshire, England. It is administered by Lichfield District Council, based in Lichfield.

The dignity and privileges of the City of Lichfield are vested in the parish council of the 14 km² Lichfield civil parish. The non-metropolitan district of Lichfield covers nearly 25 times this area and its local authority is Lichfield District Council.

The district was formed on 1 April 1974, under the Local Government Act 1972, by a merger of the existing City of Lichfield with most of the Lichfield Rural District.

Geography 

The district includes areas in two parliamentary constituencies: Lichfield and Tamworth.

Settlements within the district

Alrewas, Armitage
Blithbury, Burntwood
Chase Terrace, Chasetown, Chorley, Clifton Campville, Colton, Comberford, Croxall, Curborough
Drayton Bassett
Edingale, Elford, Elmhurst
Farewell, Fazeley, Fisherwick, Fradley
Gentleshaw
Hademore, Hammerwich, Hamstall Ridware, Handsacre, Harlaston, Haunton, Hill Ridware, Hilliards Cross, Hints, Hopwas
Kings Bromley
Lichfield, Little Aston, Little Hay, Longdon
Mavesyn Ridware, Mile Oak
Orgreave
Pipe Ridware
Rileyhill
Shenstone, Stockwell Heath, Stonnall, Streethay, Swinfen
Thorpe Constantine
Upper Longdon
Wall, Weeford, Whittington, Wigginton

Politics

Elections to the district council are held every four years, with all of the 56 seats on the council being elected. The council has been controlled by the Conservative party, except for a period of no overall control between 1973 and 1976, and a period of Labour control between 1995, and 1999.

The current (November 2021) political composition of Lichfield District Council is:

Since 2011, Lichfield has formed part of the Greater Birmingham & Solihull Local Enterprise Partnership along with neighbouring authorities Birmingham, Bromsgrove, Cannock Chase, East Staffordshire, Redditch, Solihull, Tamworth and Wyre Forest.

Responsibilities 

 Sport, leisure and recreation
 Parks
 Arts and tourism (including the Lichfield Garrick Theatre)
 Housing advice
 Housing and council tax benefits
 Local plans
 Planning and building control
 Environmental health
 Waste and recycling collections
 Street cleaning
 Licensing and inspections of food, taxis, etc.
 Off street parking and car parks
 Collection of council tax and business rates
 Community safety and community development

Political control 

The council is majority Conservative controlled and the leader since 2019 has been Doug Pullen, who succeeded Mike Wilcox.

Before May 2011, the second largest group was the Liberal Democrat and Independent Alliance set up after the 2007 elections. They were made up of Liberal Democrat and independent councillors.

At the 2011 elections the Conservatives retained overall control. The Liberal Democrats and Independent councillors lost all of their 7 seats at the election. Of the 56 seats, the council is divided between Conservatives (46) and Labour (10).

Wards 
Lichfield District’s 22 wards are:

Lichfield City 
 Boley Park, 
 Chadsmead,
 Curborough
 Leomansley, 
 St John’s, 
 Stowe, 

Burntwood 
 Boney Hay and Central,
 Chase Terrace, 
 Chasetown, 
 Highfield
 Summerfield and All Saints

Outlying villages
 Alrewas and Fradley, 
 Armitage with Handsacre,
 Bourne Vale,
 Colton and the Ridwares (including Mavesyn Ridware), 
 Fazeley
 Hammerwich with Wall, 
 Little Aston, and Stonnall
 Longdon
 Mease Valley
 Shenstone, 
 Whittington and Streehay

Demographics
According to mid-2020 estimates, the population of Lichfield district is 105,637, with 53,583 (50.7%) of the population female.

In the 2011 census, 69% of the population reported their religion as Christianity, and 23% reported no religion. 6% did not state a religion, with the remainder reporting other religions.  The most common ethnicity was White British, 94.6%, followed by Other White, 1.5%, and Asian/Asian British: Indian, 0.9%.

Places of interest

Adventure and excitement
Drayton Manor Theme Park - A 280-acre theme park and zoo with 35 rides in total, including 5 roller coasters and 4 water rides.
Curborough Sprint Course - A premier motorsport venue for speed sprinting against the clock.

Arts and entertainment
Lichfield Garrick Theatre - A modern theatre seating 480 people, named after David Garrick who was brought up in Lichfield.

History and heritage
Lichfield Cathedral - The only medieval cathedral in Europe with three spires. The present building was started in 1195, and completed by the building of the Lady Chapel in the 1330s. It replaced a Norman building begun in 1085 which had replaced one, or possibly two, Saxon buildings from the seventh century.
Cathedral Close - Surrounding the Cathedral with its many fine buildings is one of the most unspoilt in the country.
Samuel Johnson Birthplace Museum - A museum to Samuel Johnson's life, work and personality.
Erasmus Darwin House - Home to Erasmus Darwin, the house was restored to create a museum which opened to the public in 1999.
Lichfield Heritage Centre - in St Mary's Church in the market square, an exhibition of 2,000 years of Lichfield's history.
Bishop's Palace - Built in 1687, the palace was the residence of the Bishop of Lichfield until 1954, it is now used by the Cathedral School.
Milley's Hospital - Located on Beacon Street, it dates back to 1504 and was a women's hospital.
Hospital of St John Baptist without the Barrs - A distinctive Tudor building with a row of eight brick chimneys. This was built outside the city walls (barrs) to provide accommodation for travellers arriving after the city gates were closed. It now provides home for elderly people and has an adjacent Chapel.
Church of St Chad - A 12th-century church though extensively restored, on its site is a Holy Well by which St Chad is said to have prayed and used the waters healing properties.
Christ Church - An outstanding example of Victorian ecclesiastical architecture and a grade II* listed building.
The Franciscan Friary - The ruins of the former Friary in Lichfield, now classed as a Scheduled Ancient Monument.
Lichfield Clock Tower - A Grade II listed 19th century clock tower, located south of Festival Gardens.
Outdoors is a replica trench from World War I, and several armoured fighting vehicles.
The Market Square - In the centre of the city of Lichfield, the square contains two statues, one of Samuel Johnson overlooking the house in which he was born, and one of his great friend and biographer, James Boswell.

Parks and the great outdoors
Beacon Park - An  public park in the centre of the city, used for many sporting and recreational activities.
Minster Pool & Stowe Pool - The two lakes occupying 16 acres in the heart of Lichfield, Stowe Pool is designated a SSSI site as it is home to native White-Clawed Crayfish.
Chasewater Country Park - A country park including a 3-square-kilometre reservoir which hosts a variety of activities including water skiing, sailing, angling and bird watching. The Chasewater habitat also supports several rare plant and animal species.
Chasewater Railway - A 2 mile long, former colliery railway running round the shores of Chasewater.
Garden of Remembrance - Located next to Lichfield Cathedral and Minster Pool, the garden was opened in 1920 to commemorate soldiers lost in the First World War.
Gentleshaw Common - A Site of Special Scientific Interest that contains rare species of heathland plants.
Fradley Junction - A canal junction between Fradley and Alrewas popular with gongoozlers and other visitors. Fradley Pool Nature Reserve is adjacent to the junction.
Prince's Park - Located in Burntwood, it is featured in the Guinness Book of Records for being the smallest park in the United Kingdom.

Shopping and retail
Three Spires Shopping Centre - The principle shopping area in the heart of Lichfield with over 40 top name stores and 750 parking spaces.
Heart of the Country Shopping Village - Individual shops and distinctive restaurants, a welcome alternative to high street shopping.

Plans have been approved for Friarsgate, a new £100 million shopping and leisure complex opposite Lichfield City Station. The police station, bus station, Ford garage and multi-storey car park will be demolished to make way for new retail space and leisure facilities consisting of a flagship department store, six-screen cinema, hotel, 37 individual shops, 56 apartments and over 700 car parking spaces.

Staffordshire Hoard Discovery

Discovered in a field near the village of Hammerwich, near Lichfield City, in Staffordshire, on 5 July 2009, the Staffordshire Hoard is the largest hoard of Anglo-Saxon gold and silver metalwork ever found. It consists of nearly 4,000 items that are nearly all martial in character. The artefacts have tentatively been dated to the 7th or 8th centuries, placing the origin of the items in the time of the Kingdom of Mercia.

The hoard was valued at £3.285 million, and was purchased by the Birmingham Museum & Art Gallery and the Potteries Museum & Art Gallery where items from the hoard are displayed.

See also 
Lichfield District Council elections

External links

 Collection of Lichfield District Scenes
 Lichfield District Council

References

 
Non-metropolitan districts of Staffordshire